Dual Plover is an independent Australian record label founded in Sydney in 1995 by Lucas Abela and Swerve Harris. Dual Plover's first release "a kombi - music to drive-by" consisted of recordings from a Volkswagen Kombi van originally recorded at picturesque Waverley Cemetery in September 1994.
From 1996 onwards they have also been manufacturing CDs and DVDs as well as touring artists such as Kevin Blechdom, Al Duval and many others, both in their native Australia as well as internationally.

Notable artists from past and present 
 Al Duval
 Alternahunk
 Bradbury
 Deerhoof
 Deano Merino
 Justice Yeldham And The Dynamic Ribbon Device
 Mascara Sue
 Merzbow
 Naked On The Vague
 New Waver
 Noise Ramones
 Peeled Hearts Paste
 Singing Sadie
 Sister Gwen McKay
 Sweden (artist)
 Suicidal Rap Orgy
 Spazmodics
 Toxic Lipstick
 Volvox (band)
 Winner (band)

See also 
 List of record labels
 :Category:Australian record labels
 Experimental music

References 

http://www.realtimearts.net/article/issue74/8194
https://web.archive.org/web/20110614152413/http://www.cyclicdefrost.com/review.php?review=15

External links 
 Dual Plover – Official site
 pLOVER Downloads Free Music Archive Curators Page
 pLOVER Myspace  – Official Myspace
 channel at YouTube
 Dual Plover at Discogs.com

Experimental music record labels
Australian independent record labels
Record labels established in 1995